"You Make Loving Fun" is a song written and sung by Christine McVie of British-American rock band Fleetwood Mac. The song was released as the fourth and final 45 rpm single from the band's 1977 album Rumours. "You Make Loving Fun" was the album's fourth top-ten hit, as the song peaked at  9 on the US Billboard Hot 100.

Background
The song was inspired by an affair Christine McVie had with the band's lighting director, Curry Grant. "To avoid flare-ups", she told her then-husband and fellow band member, John McVie that the song was about her dog. 

Early tracking of the song was done, according to McVie, in the absence of Lindsey Buckingham, which gave her the freedom to "build the song on [her] own".. Buckingham played rhythm guitar on a Fender Stratocaster, and tracking was done with a Rhodes Electric Piano, and Stevie Nicks played the tambourine. John McVie's bass was re-recorded, and Christine McVie dubbed Hohner Clavinet parts. The song uses descending seconds in its chord progression. In an interview with the New York Post, McVie remarked that she wanted it to be the third US single from the album, but "Don't Stop" was chosen instead.

"You Make Loving Fun" was a concert staple for Fleetwood Mac and was played during every tour that included Christine McVie from 1976 until 1997, a year before McVie's departure from the band and retirement from touring. However, the song was briefly revived for Fleetwood Mac's 2014–2015 tour when McVie rejoined the band.

Reception
Cash Box said McVie's "magical words are complemented by angelic backing vocals, strident guitar melodies, and the pulsating backbeat reinforced by her own electric keyboard."  Record World called it a "light rocker with a compelling love lyric."

Personnel
 Christine McVie – electric piano, clavinet, Hammond B3 organ, lead vocals
 Mick Fleetwood – drums, wind chimes, castanets
 John McVie – bass guitar
 Lindsey Buckingham – guitars, tom toms, backing vocals
 Stevie Nicks – tambourine, backing vocals

Charts

Weekly charts

Year-end charts

Certifications

Cover versions
Cyndi Lauper covered "You Make Loving Fun" in 1984. A non-album single, it was only released in Japan.

References

External links
 Lyrics of this song
 

1977 singles
Fleetwood Mac songs
Songs written by Christine McVie
Song recordings produced by Ken Caillat
Song recordings produced by Richard Dashut
1977 songs
Warner Records singles